Crestwood is a village about 24 miles southwest of Chicago in Cook County, Illinois, United States. Per the 2020 census, the population was 10,826. 

The Windy City ThunderBolts of the independent baseball Frontier League play at Ozinga Field in Crestwood.

Geography

Demographics
As of the 2020 census there were 10,826 people, 4,862 households, and 2,281 families residing in the village. The racial makeup of the village was 74.75% White, 10.06% African American, 0.30% Native American, 1.76% Asian, 0.03% Pacific Islander, 5.71% from other races, and 7.40% from two or more races. Hispanic or Latino of any race were 14.30% of the population.

There were 4,862 households, out of which 28.96% had children under the age of 18 living with them, 32.54% were married couples living together, 9.21% had a female householder with no husband present, and 53.09% were non-families. 45.56% of all households were made up of individuals, and 25.65% had someone living alone who was 65 years of age or older. The average household size was 2.99 and the average family size was 2.06.

The village's age distribution consisted of 14.6% under the age of 18, 6.8% from 18 to 24, 23.9% from 25 to 44, 26.7% from 45 to 64, and 27.9% who were 65 years of age or older. The median age was 48.9 years. For every 100 females, there were 84.0 males. For every 100 females age 18 and over, there were 80.2 males.

The median income for a household in the village was $60,541, and the median income for a family was $69,965. Males had a median income of $55,303 versus $31,707 for females. The per capita income for the village was $30,003. About 3.1% of families and 11.0% of the population were below the poverty line, including 9.4% of those under age 18 and 16.8% of those age 65 or over.

Note: the US Census treats Hispanic/Latino as an ethnic category. This table excludes Latinos from the racial categories and assigns them to a separate category. Hispanics/Latinos can be of any race.

Government
The current mayor Kenneth Klein, who was appointed following the resignation of Lou Presta. Catherine Johnson is the Village Clerk. The board of Trustees is as follows.
Patricia Theresa Flynn
 Anthony J. Benigno
 Linda M. Madlener
 Kevin Wasag
 Vacant
 Frank Caldario

On November 17th, 2021, Mayor Louis Presta resigned after pleading guilty to a federal bribery case regarding red light cameras installed in the village.

Robert Stranczek, son of former mayor Chester Stranczek. Chester retired in October 2007, and it was then announced that Robert would be taking over his father's role as mayor.

Crestwood's government used to rebate to its residents a portion of their property and other municipal tax payments.  It was praised by proponents of small government for its low taxes and cheap government. Crestwood's rebates ended in 2009 so that the village could pay the legal fees associated with the contaminated water scandal.

Crestwood is in Illinois's 1st congressional district. After the 2020 census it will be split between the 1st and Illinois's 6th congressional district.

Crestwood is home to several units of the Illinois National Guard, including Battery B, 2nd Battalion 122 Field Artillery; Company B, 404th Brigade Support Battalion; Company G, 634th Brigade Support Battalion; 108th Signal Company; and the 1744th Transportation Company.

Education

Delia M. Turner Elementary School, a Pre-K - Kindergarten school of the Posen-Robbins School District 143½, is within Crestwood.

Notable people

 Ron Mahay, pitcher for eight Major League Baseball teams
 Joan Patricia Murphy, Illinois politician

Water contamination

In April 2009, the Chicago Tribune in an investigative article titled "Poison in the Well", reported that the water from a well used to supply residents with drinking water had been contaminated with chemicals (including two linked to the known carcinogen perchloroethylene) from dry cleaning solvents. Village of Crestwood officials, including Mayor Robert Stranczek, and the former mayor Chester Stranczek, were accused of secretly and illegally using the well and lying to regulatory authorities in order to cover that up. The ensuing investigation has generated three class-action lawsuits, two wrongful death lawsuits, and several federal raids.  Tricia Krause, a mother of a son who had leukemia for six years and a daughter who had a brain tumor alerted the USEPA of the wrongdoings of the Village of Crestwood officials.

In April 2013, certified water operator Frank Scaccia pleaded guilty to one count of making a false statement. Crestwood's police chief and former water supervisor, Theresa Neubauer, was also found guilty of making false statements to regulators. Former Mayor Chester Stranczek was declared not fit to stand trial due to dementia.

See also 
Crestwood Public Library

References

External links

 Village of Crestwood official website

Villages in Illinois
Chicago metropolitan area
Villages in Cook County, Illinois
Populated places established in 1928
1928 establishments in Illinois